Taste the Blood of Dracula is a 1970 British supernatural horror film produced by Hammer Film Productions. Directed by Peter Sasdy from a script by Anthony Hinds, it is the fifth installment in Hammer's Dracula series, and the fourth to star Christopher Lee as Count Dracula, the titular vampire. The film also features Geoffrey Keen and Gwen Watford.

Taste the Blood of Dracula was released on a double bill alongside Crescendo, another Hammer production. It was followed by Scars of Dracula, also released in 1970.

Plot
While travelling through Eastern Europe, a businessman named Weller is thrown from his carriage during a struggle and knocked unconscious. After regaining consciousness, he discovers it is night time. Shortly after, Weller sees a caped figure screaming in agony with a large crucifix impaling him from the back (it matches to some extent with the ending of the previous film : Dracula Has Risen from the Grave). The figure dies and quickly disintegrates. Examining the remains, Weller finds a ring, a cape and a brooch with dried blood on it. On the brooch, he reads the name Dracula.

Some time later, three gentlemen—William Hargood, Samuel Paxton and Jonathon Secker— form a circle ostensibly devoted to charitable work. In reality, they visit brothels. One night, they are intrigued by a young man who bursts into the brothel and is immediately tended to after snapping his fingers. The gentlemen turns out to be Lord Courtley, who was disinherited by his father for celebrating a Black Mass years ago.

Courtley meets the three and takes them to the Cafe Royal. He promises them experiences they will never forget if they visit Weller and purchase from him Dracula's ring, cloak and dried blood. Having done so, the three meet with Courtley at an abandoned church for a ceremony during which he puts the dried blood into goblets and mixes it with drops of his own blood, telling the men to drink. They refuse, so he drinks the blood himself, screams and falls to the ground. As he grabs for Hargood's legs, all three gentlemen kick and beat him, not stopping until Courtley dies, at which they flee. While they return to their respective homes, Courtley's body, left in the abandoned church, transforms into Dracula, who vows that those who have killed his servant will be destroyed.

Dracula begins his revenge with Hargood, a drunk who treats his daughter Alice harshly, furious that she continues to see Paul, Paxton's son. Dracula takes control of Alice's mind via hypnosis, making her pick up a shovel and kill her father. The next day, Hargood is found dead and Alice is missing. At her father's funeral, she hides behind bushes and attracts the attention of Paul's sister Lucy. That night, the two enter the abandoned church, and Alice introduces her to a dark figure. Assuming him to be Alice's lover, Lucy is greeted by Dracula, who turns her into a vampire.

With Hargood dead and Alice and Lucy missing, Paxton teams-up with Secker and visits the abandoned church. Courtley's corpse is missing but they discover Lucy asleep in a coffin with marks on her throat. Realizing she is a vampire, Secker tries to stake her, but Paxton shoots him in the arm, forcing him to flee. While Secker runs away, Paxton weeps over his daughter's body. When he finally develops the courage to stake her, she awakens, and Dracula appears. Alice pins Paxton down and Lucy drives a wooden stake through his chest, killing him. That night, Secker's son Jeremy sees Lucy, his fiancé, and approaches her. She bites his throat, enslaving him while Dracula watches. The vampire Jeremy then stabs his father to death on Lucy's orders. When she starts begging for his approval, Dracula drains her dry and leaves her destroyed. Back at the church, he prepares to bite Alice but a cock crows and he returns to his coffin.

Secker's body causes Jeremy's arrest. While traying to defend Jeremy, Paul finds letter in which Secker instructs him on how to fight the vampires. Following Secker's instructions, Paul goes to the abandoned church and finds Lucy's exsanguinated body, floating in a lake. He bars the door at the church with a large cross and clears the altar of Black Mass instruments, replacing them with the proper materials. He calls for Alice, who appears with Dracula. Paul confronts Dracula with a cross but Alice, still entranced, disarms him. Dracula dismisses her and tries to leave, but is prevented by the cross barring the door. His retreat is also barred by a cross which an angry and disappointed Alice threw to the floor. He climbs the balcony and throws objects at Paul and Alice, before backing into a stained glass window depicting a cross. He breaks the glass but suddenly sees the changed surroundings and hears the Lord's Prayer recited in Latin. Dazzled and overwhelmed by the power of the newly re-sanctified church, Dracula falls to the altar and dissolves back into dust. With the vampire destroyed, Paul and Alice leave.

Cast

Production notes
Taste the Blood of Dracula was originally written without Dracula appearing at all. With Christopher Lee's increasing reluctance to reprise the role, Hammer intended to replace Lee and Dracula in the franchise with the Lord Courtley character played by Ralph Bates, who would rise as a vampire after his death and seek revenge on Hargood, Paxton, and Secker. Hammer's American distributor refused to release the film if it lacked an appearance by Dracula; this prompted Hammer to convince Lee to return, with Dracula replacing the resurrected Courtley.
The scenes of the gentlemen's visit to the local brothel were heavily edited on the film's original release. They are fully reinstated on the DVD release.
An alternative version of the scene where Lucy bites Jeremy was filmed, with the young man actually becoming a vampire. This scene was not used, possibly to avoid complicating the plot further with the introduction of another vampire.

Release

Certification
In its original United States release, it was rated GP (General audience, Parental guidance suggested—the forerunner to today's PG), but when it was re-released to DVD it was rated R for sexual content/nudity and brief violence.

Critical reception
Variety wrote that director Peter Sasdy had directed his first feature film "effectively, leavening stock situations with the occasional shock twist, and has kept the Dracula pix atmosphere well." The review noted that "Christopher Lee can now play Dracula in his sleep and, in this pic, looks occasionally as if he is doing so." The Monthly Film Bulletin called it "absolutely routine Hammer horror, except that the script is even more laboured than usual. Dracula himself is virtually reduced to an onlooker while the happy families decimate each other at his behest, and the only moment of inspiration is when a would-be vampire stalker is himself staked by two gleeful vampires." John C. Mahoney of the Los Angeles Times wrote that the film was "superior in production, performance, story and atmosphere to the recent Dracula Has Risen from the Grave. In the title role, Christopher Lee seems to take new interest in the role with a terrifyingly bloodshot performance."

The Hammer Story: The Authorised History of Hammer Films called the film "the finest genuine Dracula sequel in the entire [Hammer Dracula] series." It currently holds a positive 67% score on Rotten Tomatoes based on 12 reviews.

Home media
On 6 November 2007, the movie was released in a film pack along with Dracula, Dracula Has Risen from the Grave, and Dracula A.D. 1972.

On 6 October 2015, the movie was released in a Hammer collection pack on Blu-ray along with Dracula Has Risen from the Grave, Frankenstein Must Be Destroyed, and The Mummy. It was also released on Blu-ray separately.

See also
 Vampire film

References

Sources

External links

1970 films
1970 horror films
British sequel films
Films shot at Associated British Studios
1970s English-language films
Dracula films
Hammer Film Productions horror films
Films directed by Peter Sasdy
Films scored by James Bernard
Dracula (Hammer film series)
Resurrection in film
Warner Bros. films
Films set in London
Films set in the 19th century
1970s historical horror films
British historical horror films
1970s British films